Milligan Hills Provincial Park is a provincial park in British Columbia, Canada, located  northeast of Fort St. John near the border with Alberta.

References
BC Parks page

External links

Peace River Regional District
Provincial parks of British Columbia
Peace River Country
1999 establishments in British Columbia
Protected areas established in 1999